Soromonichthys stearleyi is a species of armored catfish endemic to Venezuela where it occurs in Soromoni Creek in Amazonas State.  This species grows to a length of  SL.

References
 

Loricariidae
Fish of Venezuela
Endemic fauna of Venezuela
Fish described in 2011